"Cnephasia" melanophaea is a species of moth in the family Tortricidae. It is endemic to New Zealand.

The wingspan is 18–20 mm. The forewings are dark purplish-grey, mixed with white and some scattered blackish strigulae. The hindwings of the males are grey, becoming darker posteriorly. The hindwings of the females are pale grey, becoming grey posteriorly.

References

Moths described in 1927
Cnephasiini
Moths of New Zealand
Taxa named by Edward Meyrick
Endemic fauna of New Zealand
Endemic moths of New Zealand